Crane Company Building may refer to:
Crane Company Building (Chicago)
Crane Company Building (North Carolina), Charlotte, North Carolina